Jinnah Ke Naam, also spelled as Jinnah Kay Naam is a Pakistani romantic drama that was aired in 2009 on PTV Home. The drama stars Sami Khan and Saba Qamar in lead roles. The drama was directed by Tariq Mairaj. Jinnah Ke Naam is named after Muhammad Ali Jinnah, who is the founder of Pakistan.

Cast
 Sami Khan as Ali
 Saba Qamar as Fatima Jinnah
 Agha Ali as Sameer
 Ghazala Butt as Nida
 Sherry Shah as Sabiha
 Maira Khan

Awards 
 Best TV Play (Terrestrial)-Nominated
 Best TV Actress (Terrestrial)-Saba Qamar-Nominated 
 Best TV Director-Tariq Mairaj-Nominated
 Best TV Writer-Kashif Nisar-Nominated

See also
 Pakistani dramas
 List of Pakistani dramas

References

2007 Pakistani television series debuts
Pakistani romantic drama television series